Year 1026 (MXXVI) was a common year starting on Saturday (link will display the full calendar) of the Julian calendar.

Events 
 By place 
 Europe 
 Spring – King Conrad II, "the Elder", assembles an army of thousands of armored knights for an expedition into Italy. He besieges Pavia and marches to Milan, where he is crowned with the Iron Crown by Archbishop Aribert as king of the Lombards. Duke William V ("the Great") of Aquitaine, who is already en route for Italy, decides to renounce his claim to the Lombard throne and turns back.
 April – Conrad II punishes the citizens of Pavia with starvation, with the help of Milanese troops, for burning down the Royal Palace. He appoints Aribert as his viceroy ("imperial vicar") in Italy and charges him to ensure that the order is complied with.
 Summer – Conrad II leaves the bulk of his army at the siege of Pavia, and marches to Ravenna. The Ravennan militias close the town gates and assault the imperial train. Conrad rallies his troops and takes Ravenna, taking bloody revenge.
 1 June – The Basilica of Saint Maternus in Walcourt, present-day Belgium, is consecrated by Bishop .
 Conrad II proceeds to Pesaro, but a malarian outbreak forces him to withdraw back up north to the Po Valley. He subdues the March of Turin, where Count Ulric Manfred II opposes the election of Conrad.
 Autumn – Pavia falls to the imperial forces. Only the intervention of Odilo of Cluny persuades Conrad to have mercy on the city and the defeated rebels. 
 Battle of Helgeå (off the coast of Sweden): Naval forces of King Cnut the Great's North Sea Empire defeat the combined Swedish and Norwegian royal fleets.
 9-year-old Henry "the Black" is made duke of Bavaria by his father, Conrad II, after the death of his predecessor Henry V.
 Pietro Barbolano becomes 28th doge of Venice.

 Asia 
 A Zubu revolt against the Liao dynasty is suppressed, with the Zubu forced to pay an annual tribute of horses, camels and furs.

Births 
 Lidanus, Lombard Benedictine abbot (d. 1118)
 Tostig Godwinson, earl of Northumbria (approximate date)
 Pope Victor III, born Dauferio, Lombard churchman (approximate date)
 William Firmatus, Norman hermit and pilgrim (d. 1103)

Deaths 
 June 10 – Hugh II, French viscount and archbishop 
 August 28 – Richard II, "the Good", duke of Normandy
 August 30 – Bononio, Lombard hermit and abbot
 September 21 – Otto-William, count of Burgundy
 November 27 – Adalbold II, bishop of Utrecht
 Adelaide-Blanche of Anjou, French queen and regent
 Frederick II, duke of Upper Lorraine (Lotharingia)
 Henry V, duke of Bavaria (House of Luxembourg)
 Hugh IV, lord of Lusignan (approximate date)
 Leo of Vercelli, German archdeacon and bishop

References